Hekmatestan (also Romanized as Ḩekmatestān and Ḩekmatsetān; also known as Ḩekmatān and Ḩokmestān) is a village in Tudeshk Rural District, Kuhpayeh District, Isfahan County, Isfahan Province, Iran. At the 2006 census, its population was 28, in 6 families.

References 

Populated places in Isfahan County